Hélène Desputeaux (born July 10, 1959) is a Canadian educator, writer and illustrator from Quebec. With writer Christine L'Heureux,  she created and illustrated the character Caillou who has appeared in a series of children's books and television series.

Early life and education
Desputeaux was born in Quebec City, Quebec and received a Bachelor of Arts in visual arts from Laval University and a BEd from the Université du Québec à Montréal.

Career
Desputeaux has produced more than 100 children's books. In 1995, she received the Médaille Raymond-Blais for her body of work.

Desputeaux and the publisher Éditions Chouette went to court to resolve a dispute over the ownership of the Caillou character. A Quebec arbitrator found that the character was jointly owned. This decision was reversed by the Quebec Court of Appeal, which found that the arbitrator could not rule on the question of copyright, but the appeal court's ruling was overturned by the Supreme Court of Canada.

Selected works 
 The Emperor's New Clothes, text by Hans Christian Andersen (1984)
 Purple, Green, and Yellow (1992), text by Robert Munsch
 Caillou, la petite soeur and Caillou, le petit pot, text by Joceline Sanschagrin, received the Mr. Christie's Book Award in 1993
 Where is Gah-Ning? (1994), text by Robert Munsch

Personal life
Desputeaux married children's author Michel Aubin; the couple have two daughters.

References 

1959 births
Artists from Quebec City
Canadian children's book illustrators
Living people
Writers from Quebec City
Université Laval alumni
French Quebecers